WSSP (1250 AM) is a Milwaukee-based sports talk station owned by Audacy, Inc.  Its studios and transmitter are co-located in Hales Corners.

History
The 1250 AM facility went on the air as WMAW on March 24, 1948. On August 16, 1948, the 5,000-watt station became the area's affiliate of the ABC Radio Network. In June 1952, the call sign changed to WCAN. Station owner Lou Poller eventually started WCAN-TV (Channel 25), one of the earliest UHF stations in the United States and an affiliate of the CBS Television Network, before CBS itself purchased a rival UHF facility.

In 1955, Poller sold the 1250 AM license to the owners of WEMP, which had been operating as a 250-watt signal on 1340 AM. The new owners moved the WEMP call sign to 1250 AM, where it stayed for many years afterward. The station at 1340 AM, under new ownership, became WRIT.

Over the years, WEMP aired a variety of formats, including Top 40, Country music and adult contemporary. In January 1984, WEMP switched to oldies, featuring personalities such as John Gardner, Dick Alpert and Ernie Bottom. During the 1990s, WEMP ran Westwood One's oldies format with Gardner doing the morning drive. On August 16, 1998, WEMP switched its format to brokered religious/Christian AC, retaining the WEMP calls. The final oldie played on WEMP was Don McLean's "American Pie". This format continued until WSSP launched in December 2004.

The station launched the all-sports format on January 1, 2005, after stunting with a loop of Bobby Bare's "Drop Kick Me Jesus Through The Goalposts of Life."  Longtime area broadcaster Chuck Garbedian anchored the morning show with Chicago native Johnny Vonn.  Veteran sports talk show host Peter Brown was tabbed to do afternoon drive. The WEMP calls were used for a year in New York City by an all-news radio station between 2011 and 2012 (the current WFAN-FM, now an Entercom sister station since late 2017), before returning to Wisconsin towards the end of 2013 for the new station WEMP in Two Rivers.

In late 2006, the station underwent a period of change.  Program director Chip Ramsey, who had been with the station since it signed on in the sports format, was fired on August 9, 2006 and replaced by Ryan Maguire, who directed a series of moves soon after.  Weekday afternoon talk show host Peter Brown was fired on December 7, 2006.  Mid-day hosts Cliff Saunders and Gary Ellerson were moved into Brown's slot.  Morning show host Chuck Garbedian was let go in early January 2007. He was replaced by former WTMJ and Sporting News Radio personality Doug Russell, a Milwaukee native. The station also acquired the rights to University of Wisconsin–Madison hockey games and coaches shows. Mike Wickett, who worked closely with Maguire when both were on the air at WTKA in Ann Arbor, Michigan, was hired to co-host mornings with Russell. Steve Fifer was tabbed to host the 9-11A.M. shift.

In June 2007, the station acquired the rights to Milwaukee Admirals hockey, taking them away from cross-town rival WAUK. The contract ran up until the 2017-18 AHL season, when WOKY “The Big 920” and WVTV-DT2 “My 24” acquired the broadcasting rights next season.

The station modified its lineup in September 2008 using existing hosts in new positions. Cliff Saunders was moved into the morning slot after Doug Russell and Mike Wickett.  Gary Ellerson stayed in the afternoon drive slot where he is joined by Josh Vernier and former morning host Steve Fifer as part of the "Big Show". In October 2008, Saunders was replaced by the nationally syndicated Dan Patrick Show

In January 2009, Maguire left WSSP for Entercom sister station KCSP in Kansas City, Missouri. Former WTMJ program director Tom Parker replaced Maguire at WSSP. Jim Rome's syndicated show was replaced by Bill "The Big Unit" Michaels, formerly of WTMJ and the pre-game and post-game shows of the Packers Radio Network, in the summer of 2011. Entercom syndicates The Bill Michaels Show across the state for live or tape-delayed airing the same day. WSSP also aired syndicated programming from Fox Sports Radio until January 2013, when they switched to CBS Sports Radio.

The station was simulcasted on WXSS-FM's HD2 subchannel from October 2010 to October 2020. In July 2014, the station began broadcasting on an FM translator station using the WXSS-HD2 signal, W289CB, from Shorewood on 105.7 FM. This became the primary signal for branding on October 1, 2014, as the station rebranded as "105.7 The Fan".

On October 5, 2020, Entercom announced that WSSP would no longer be simulcast on 105.7 FM and would revert its branding to "1250 The Fan."

On August 16, 2022, 1250-AM The Fan ended all local programming in Milwaukee, laid off its entire staff, and switched to a 24/7 simulcast of CBS Sports Radio. The changes in programming were made as part of nationwide cuts to Audacy stations.

Other uses of the WSSP call letters
From 1984-1990, the WSSP call letters were assigned to 104.1 FM in Cocoa Beach, Florida. "WSSPer 104" was as an easy listening station.

References

External links
 

FCC History Cards for WSSP

SSP
Sports radio stations in the United States
CBS Sports Radio stations
Audacy, Inc. radio stations
1948 establishments in Wisconsin